Sam B. Jacobson (born July 4, 1893, Brooklyn, New York; died December 31, 1946, Catskill, New York, age 53) was the editor of Frank Buck’s second film, Wild Cargo.

Early years
Sam B. Jacobson was born in Brooklyn, New York, son of  Max W Jacobson, a Russian immigrant insurance agent, and Stella Jacobson. Sam B. Jacobson served in World War I as a lieutenant responsible for providing troop entertainment.

Motion Pictures
In 1928, Jacobson, as publicity director at Universal Pictures, created the Laemmle Novelties, a series of thirteen one-reel-silent films.  Jacques Rollens directed. Surprising for the time, the films had no beautiful faces. In Wooden Soldier the characters are toys. The heroine of Rag Doll is just what the title implies and Wax Figures reveals the astounding adventures of a group of store window dummies. Monkey Shines sees life through the eyes of a pair of monkeys at the zoo. In Wash Line Romance a wash line is the title character; the people who wear what is hanging on the wash line do not appear except as hands and feet. The hero of Prodigal Pup is a dog. Other titles in the series: Footprints, Faces, Bottles, Handicapped, Shadows, Daydreams, and Half Holiday.  Subsequently, Jacobson originated and produced the Universal Newspaper Newsreel.

Jacobson was a vice president of First National Pictures in 1929. In the 1930s he served as General Production Manager for Van Beuren Studios, where he edited Frank Buck’s second film, Wild Cargo, and another movie, Adventure Girl with Joan Lowell. Jacobson was associate producer of Cross Country Cruise, Ladies Must Love, and Love, Honor, and Oh! Baby. He also wrote film criticism for a Los Angeles Jewish newspaper.

Later life
For 13½ years, Jacobson was the owner of a weekly newspaper, the Hunter (NY) Review. He died of heart disease and pneumonia in 1946 and is buried in Maplewood Cemetery, Jewett, New York. His parents, a brother, and two sisters survived him.

References

External links
Sam B Jacobson on the Internet Movie Database 

1893 births
1946 deaths
American film editors
American people of Russian-Jewish descent
Film producers from New York (state)
People from Brooklyn